Scott Pinsker is a filmmaker, talk-show host, author and celebrity publicist.  He has written for Foxnews.com, The Washington Times, Breitbart, Jewish World Review, and Bulldog Reporter.  He was the creator and executive producer of National Lampoon's Strip Poker in 2005, and also appeared in Academy Award-nominated director Brett Morgen's political film Ollie's Army and the Academy Award-nominated documentary A Perfect Candidate.

His novel, The Second Coming: A Love Story, was released in June 2014.

Early life and education
Pinsker was a College Republican leader at James Madison University in the 1990s.  His exploits, which included a "hostile takeover" of the rival political organization Clean Up Congress, was memorably showcased in director Brett Morgen's film, Ollie's Army.

Career
After graduating from George Mason University School of Law, Pinsker hosted The Stretch for WTMA radio in Charleston, South Carolina, from 2000 to 2001. Among his radio highlights was Charleston City Councilman Kawadjo Campbell announcing that he was leaving the Democratic Party. Councilman Campbell formally switched to the Republican Party shortly thereafter, becoming one of just a small number of African American elected officials in the GOP.

Pinsker moved to Tampa Bay, Florida in 2003 and launched a career in public relations. He quickly began representing a number of professional poker players, just as the sport was experiencing a cultural revival.  Included among the players he worked closely with was Phil Gordon, who was the host of NBC/Bravo Network's Celebrity Poker Showdown. At a celebrity poker tournaments in Houston, Texas, which took place in conjunction with Super Bowl XXXVIII and included such celebrity participants as pro players Phil Gordon, Phil Hellmuth, Howard Lederer and Chris Ferguson, as well as celebs Marcus Allen, Clyde Drexler, Yanni, Jerome Bettis, Eddie George, and Kato Kaelin, Pinsker decided to make a poker comedy, but to use "real" poker action instead of scripted reenactments. Kaelin was employed by National Lampoon at the time and introduced Pinsker to National Lampoon executives. Soon, a deal was struck.

National Lampoon's Strip Poker was filmed at the Hedonism II nudist resort in Negril, Jamaica, and featured models, actresses, and reality TV stars in a No Limit Texas Hold 'Em poker tournament.  Pro Poker Hall of Famer Barbara Enright served as the poker coach.  The film aired on DirecTV and InDemand Pay Per View in 2005, and is noted for featuring one of the first film appearances of Olivia Munn, who is credited as Lisa Munn.

Pinsker took a hiatus from filmmaking and was the publicist for a number of athletes, celebrities and business leaders, including Michael Vick and HSN home shopping host and infomercial guru Bob Circosta. He started writing for numerous business publications as a marketing expert and commentating on TV and radio. He also wrote for numerous business publications as a marketing expert.

Following the presidential election of 2012, Pinsker's marketing analysis of Mitt Romney's missteps was sent to a FOX News Channel producer. His analysis was broken into two parts and published on Foxnews.com. His most controversial Foxnews.com column was a theoretical speech he ghostwrote for the National Rifle Association's Wayne LaPierre. The column was discussed widely on talk radio and online message board, receiving over 4,000 "likes" on Facebook.

Literary
In June 2014, Pinsker published his debut novel, The Second Coming: A Love Story. He explained in a June 16 interview with Rob McConnell of the 'X' Zone Radio Network that he'd been working on the story for 15 years. Described as a "theological thriller," Pinsker claims it's the first book ever written about the apocalyptic "End Days" battle between God and Satan, as foretold in Christian eschatology a la the Left Behind stories, but from a marketing perspective. His hypothesis is that a theologian can explain the beliefs of Jesus, but it takes a marketer to explain the actions of Satan.

Social media
Pinsker has an active presence on Twitter, where he has over 30,000 followers. The New York Daily News has republished his tweets and he has been ranked as one of the "Top 100 Branding Experts to follow on Twitter" by EC Marketing.

Bibliography
 The Second Coming: A Love Story (2014)

External links
 Scott Pinsker's Twitter page

References

American filmmakers
Living people
American male novelists
James Madison University alumni
Antonin Scalia Law School alumni
21st-century American novelists
American public relations people
21st-century American male writers
Year of birth missing (living people)